Stenoscaptia venusta is a moth in the family Erebidae first described by Thomas Pennington Lucas in 1890. It is found in Australia, where it has been recorded from the Australian Capital Territory, New South Wales and Queensland.

References

Lithosiini
Moths described in 1890